Alan McLeod Sargeson FAA FRS (30 October 1930 – 29 December 2008) was an Australian inorganic chemist.

Education and early life
Sargeson was born at Armidale, New South Wales, Australia.  He was educated at the University of Sydney and received his Ph.D. supervised by Francis Patrick Dwyer also at Sydney in 1956.

Career and research

His first academic appointment was at the University of Adelaide and then in 1958 he rejoined Dwyer at the Australian National University.

Sargeson was best known as a coordination chemist with an interest in bioinorganic chemistry.  In early work with Dwyer and throughout his career, he studied stereochemistry.  His research group investigated the reactions of amine ligands, culminating in the synthesis of the clathrochelates called "sepulchrates".

Awards and honours
He was elected a Fellow of the Royal Society (FRS) in 1983 and the Australian Academy of Science, and a corresponding member of the U.S. National Academy of Sciences.

References

1930 births
2008 deaths
Fellows of the Australian Academy of Science
Fellows of the Royal Society
Australian chemists
Inorganic chemists
Foreign associates of the National Academy of Sciences